Senator Randall may refer to:

Archibald N. Randall (1830–1916), Wisconsin State Senate
Benjamin Randall (Maine politician) (1789–1859), Maine State Senate
Charles S. Randall (1824–1904), Massachusetts State Senate
Emily Randall (fl. 2010s), Washington State Senate
Samuel J. Randall (1828–1890), Pennsylvania State Senate

See also
Rodger Randle (born 1943), Oklahoma State Senate